Lotus dorycnium, previously known by the synonym Dorycnium pentaphyllum, common names: prostrate Canary clover and badassi, is a herbaceous perennial plant belonging to the genus Lotus of the family Fabaceae.

Description
The stems and the branches are woody. The leaves are composed by five segments and are hairy on both sides. Flowers are small and white, in terminal umbels of 5–20 flowers on a short stalk. The flowering period extends from May until July.

Gallery

Distribution
Lotus dorycnium has a broadly Mediterranean distribution.

Habitat
These plants prefer semi-arid hills, sunny and dry pastures and Mediterranean environment and tolerates all soil types.

References

 Pignatti S. - Flora d'Italia - Edagricole – 1982

External links

Biolib
Dorycnium pentaphyllum
Dorycnium pentaphyllum

dorycnium
Flora of France
Flora of Italy
Flora of Spain
Taxa named by Carl Linnaeus